The Bratislava II is a district (okres) of Bratislava in the Bratislava Region of Slovakia. It covers the south-eastern part of Bratislava, including the boroughs of Ružinov, Podunajské Biskupice and Vrakuňa. It is bordered by the Bratislava I, Bratislava III, Bratislava V and Senec districts.

 

Districts of Slovakia
Boroughs of Bratislava
Geography of Bratislava Region